The Church of Jesus Christ of Latter-day Saints in Kenya refers to the Church of Jesus Christ of Latter-day Saints (LDS Church) and its members in Kenya. In 1981, two small congregations were created in Kenya (Nairobi and Kiboko). In 2021, there were Membership statistics of the Church of Jesus Christ of Latter-day Saints members in 56 congregations. On April 2, 2017, church president Thomas S. Monson announced that a temple would be built in Nairobi.

History

The first Kenyans baptized into the LDS Church in Kenya were the family of Elizaphan and Ebisiba Osaka, who were baptized in 1979. The first LDS missionaries began serving in Kenya in 1980. There was only one LDS missionary couple from then until 1989, when the couple was withdrawn.  Joseph W. Sitati, who joined the LDS Church along with his family in 1985, was designated the lead elder of the church in Kenya at that point.  In February 1991, he met with Daniel arap Moi, president of Kenya. Later that month the attorney general of Kenya gave Sitati and a few other church leaders a form signifying the church was officially recognized.

In July 1991, the Kenya Nairobi Mission was organized, with Larry King Brown as president.  The first LDS meeting house was completed in Nairobi in 1994. In 2001 a stake was organized, with Sitati called as president.  Sitati later became the first general authority from Kenya. In March 2016, the Nairobi Kenya Stake was divided to form the east and west stake.

In 2020, the mission headquartered in Nairobi mission was divided with the creation of the Tanzania Dar es Salaam Mission. In August 2020, the church organized the new Africa Central Area with its headquarters in Nairobi. The new area oversees the church in 18 countries.

Stakes and districts
As of February 2023, the following Stakes and Districts were located in Kenya:

Mission
Kenya Nairobi Mission

Temples
On April 2, 2017, Thomas S. Monson announced the intent to construct the Nairobi Kenya Temple in the church's general conference.

See also

 Religion in Kenya

References

External links
The Church of Jesus Christ of Latter-day Saints Africa South Area
The Church of Jesus Christ of Latter-day Saints Official site

Churches in Kenya
The Church of Jesus Christ of Latter-day Saints in Africa
1991 establishments in Kenya